is a professional Japanese baseball player. He plays infielder for the Chunichi Dragons.

On 20 October 2017, Takamatsu was selected as the 3rd draft pick for the Chunichi Dragons at the 2017 NPB Draft and on 15 November signed a provisional contract with a ¥50,000,000 sign-on bonus and a ¥6,000,000 yearly salary.

Takamatsu is said to see Hanshin Tigers outfielder Yoshio Itoi as his benchmark for success.

References

1999 births
Living people
Japanese baseball players
Nippon Professional Baseball infielders
Chunichi Dragons players
Baseball people from Hyōgo Prefecture
People from Kakogawa, Hyōgo